Karuba is a village in Nord-Kivu, Democratic Republic of the Congo. In September and October 2007, it was the scene of fighting between the forces of rebel general Laurent Nkunda and the army of the Democratic Republic of the Congo. The Congolese army claimed to be in control of Karuba as of October 10, 2007.

References

Populated places in North Kivu